The Taiwan Cooperative Bank (TCB) is a publicly listed bank headquartered in Taipei, Taiwan. Originally formed by the Japanese during Japanese rule in Taiwan in 1923, TCB was taken over by the Republic of China government in 1946 and has grown ever since. Today, it is one of the largest banks in Taiwan, having the most branches (301) among all banks on the island.

See also

 List of banks in Taiwan
 List of companies of Taiwan
 Economy of Taiwan
 Taiwan Cooperative Bank baseball team

References

External links
 Official bank site in English

Companies listed on the Taiwan Stock Exchange
Banks of Taiwan
Banks established in 1944
Companies based in Taipei